Richard Charles Henry Lenski (September 14, 1864 – August 14, 1936) was a German-born American-naturalized Lutheran pastor, scholar, and author who published a series of Lutheran New Testament commentaries.

Life
Lenski was born on September 14, 1864, in Greifenberg, Brandenburg-Prussia (now Gryfice, Poland). In 1872 he emigrated to the United States. He was educated at Capital University and its Theological Department, which were institutions of the Evangelical Lutheran Joint Synod of Ohio. He was ordained as a pastor in that synod in 1887, and served congregations in Baltimore, Maryland, and in Trenton, Springfield, and Anna, Ohio.

He was editor of Die Lutherische Kirchenzeitung for twenty years, beginning in 1904. In 1911, he became a professor of theology at Capital University and its theological department. He also served the Joint Synod of Ohio as president of its Western District for a number of years.

Lenski died on August 14, 1936.

Publications
Lenski's major work was a 12-volume series of commentaries on the New Testament, published originally by the Lutheran Book Concern. Each contains a literal translation of the Greek texts and commentary from a traditional Lutheran perspective. Some of the volumes were published after his death.

Other works include The Active Church Member, The Eisenach Gospel Selections, The Eisenach Old Testament Selections, The Epistle Selections of the Ancient Church, The Gospel Selections of the Ancient Church, The Sermon: Its Homiletical Construction, and Saint Paul.

Descendants
Lenski was the father of the author Lois Lenski, grandfather of the sociologist Gerhard Lenski, and great-grandfather of the evolutionary biologist Richard Lenski.

Theology
As a Lutheran, Lenski shows little sympathy for Reformed theology in his commentaries. Lenski had sometimes distanced himself from the Calvinism-Arminian debate. However he practically adopted the main distinctive tenets of the Arminian soteriology.  Though not using the exact terminology, he held to conditional election, unlimited atonement, prevenient grace and conditional preservation of the saints.

Notes and references

Citations

Sources
 
 
 
 
 
 
 
 
 

1864 births
1936 deaths
American biblical scholars
American Lutherans
Arminian theologians
German emigrants to the United States
Lutheran biblical scholars
Naturalized citizens of the United States
People from Gryfice
People from the Province of Pomerania
Translators of the Bible into English